Jean Khalil (born 19 August 1969) is a Lebanese alpine skier. He competed in two events at the 1992 Winter Olympics.

References

1969 births
Living people
Lebanese male alpine skiers
Olympic alpine skiers of Lebanon
Alpine skiers at the 1992 Winter Olympics
Place of birth missing (living people)
Alpine skiers at the 1996 Asian Winter Games